Hesperocimex is a genus of bed bugs in the family Cimicidae. There are at least two described species in Hesperocimex.

Species
These two species belong to the genus Hesperocimex:
 Hesperocimex coloradensis List, 1925 (Colorado bed bug)
 Hesperocimex sonorensis Ryckman, 1958

References

Further reading

 
 

Cimicidae
Articles created by Qbugbot